Nimtz is a surname. Notable people with this surname include:

 F. Jay Nimtz (1915–1990), American politician
 Günter Nimtz (born 1936), German physicist

See also
Nimitz (disambiguation)
 

Surnames of German origin